Builders' rites are ceremonies attendant on the laying of foundation stones, including ecclesiastical, masonic or other traditions connected with foundations or other aspects of construction.

One such custom is that of placing a few coins, newspapers, etc. within a cavity beneath the stone. Should the stone later be removed, the relics may be found. Though this tradition is still practiced, such memorials are deposited in the hope that they will never be disturbed.

History
Living victims were once entombed as a sacrifice to the gods and to ensure the stability of the building.

Grimm remarked "It was often thought necessary to entomb live animals and even men in the foundation, on which the structure was to be raised, to secure immovable stability." This gruesome practice is well evidenced, in multiple cultures. "The old pagan laid the foundation of his house and fortress in blood." Under the walls of two round towers in Ireland (the only ones examined) human skeletons were discovered. In the 15th century, the wall of Holsworthy church was built over a living human being, and when this became unlawful, images of living beings were substituted.

References to this practice can be found in Greek folk culture in a poem about "Arta's bridge". According to the poem, the wife of the chief builder was sacrificed to establish a good foundation for a bridge that was of grave importance to the secluded city of Arta. The actual bridge was constructed in 1602. A similar legend appears in the Romanian folk poem Meșterul Manole, about the building of the church in the earliest Wallachian capital city.

See also

Bay Bridge Troll
Builder's signature
Cornerstone
Foundation deposit
Hitobashira
Masonic manuscripts
Ship naming and launching
Time capsule
Topping out
Votive offering

References

Further reading
Alan Dundes' The Walled-up Wife. U.of Wisconsin Press (1996).
John V. Robinson. http://www.findarticles.com/p/articles/mi_qa3732/is_200110/ai_n8986046 "The 'topping out' traditions of the high-steel ironworkers." Western Folklore. Fall 2001.

Building
Ceremonies
Building engineering
History of construction
Rituals attending construction